Ignaz Xaver, Ritter von Seyfried (15 August 1776 – 27 August 1841) was an Austrian musician, conductor and composer. He was born and died in Vienna. According to a statement in his handwritten memoirs he was a pupil of both Wolfgang Amadeus Mozart and Johann Georg Albrechtsberger. He edited Albrechtsberger's complete written works after his death, published by Tobias Haslinger. His own pupils included Franz von Suppé, Heinrich Wilhelm Ernst, Antonio Casimir Cartellieri, Joseph Fischhof and Eduard Marxsen who would later teach Brahms.

As conductor
In his youth Seyfried served as the assistant conductor for Emanuel Schikaneder's opera troupe at the Theater auf der Wieden in Vienna, becoming musical director in 1797 and serving (in its new building, the Theater an der Wien) until 1826. His memoirs offer accounts of the first production, under Schikaneder's auspices, of Mozart's The Magic Flute, as well as a curious anecdote concerning the composer's death a few weeks later; see Death of Mozart.

In 1805, Seyfried conducted the première of the original version of Beethoven's Fidelio. Also see Piano Concerto No. 3 (Beethoven) and Choral Fantasy (Beethoven).

As composer
Seyfried composed a large amount of music from 1797 to the end of his life, including overtures and incidental music for stage plays and Singspiele, operas, ballets and melodramas; numerous sacred works – 10 masses including one for double choir, motets, requiems, psalms, hymns and oratorios; as well as two symphonies, cantatas, overtures and chamber music. A list of his works in a biography dating from 1836 fills five pages.

Of his musical works, the Grove Dictionary says: "his versatility won him a unique place in Vienna's musical life; however, almost none of his music is marked by real originality or distinction."

As arranger
He made arrangements of Beethoven's Three Equals for four trombones, WoO 30, for four-part men's chorus, performed at Beethoven's funeral; re-scored Michael Haydn's Deutsche Messe, for men's voices only; and arranged over twenty operas by others for various wind band combinations.

He also made two "Grandes Fantaisies" for orchestra, based on material from Mozart: one in C minor, built from Mozart's Fantasia K. 475 and the Piano Sonata K. 457, and the other in F minor, built from Mozart's Piano Quartet K. 478 and "Ein Orgel Stück für eine Uhr" K. 608.

Notes

Sources

Further reading
Beethoven: Die Seyfried Papiere. Reproduction and transcription of the autograph manuscripts for Biographical Notes and Character Traits & Anecdotes with exposé. BoD, Norderstedt, 2019. .

External links

 (in German)

1776 births
1841 deaths
18th-century Austrian people
18th-century classical composers
18th-century male musicians
19th-century Austrian people
19th-century classical composers
19th-century male musicians
Austrian Classical-period composers
Austrian conductors (music)
Austrian knights
Austrian male classical composers
Austrian Romantic composers
Male conductors (music)
Pupils of Johann Georg Albrechtsberger
Composers from Vienna